Petri Erkki Olavi Honkonen (born 29 July 1987) is a Finnish politician, representing the Centre Party in the Parliament of Finland since 2015. He was born in Pylkönmäki, and was elected to the Parliament from the Central Finland constituency in the 2015 elections with 2,978 votes.

References

External links
 Home page of Petri Honkonen

1987 births
Living people
People from Saarijärvi
Centre Party (Finland) politicians
Members of the Parliament of Finland (2015–19)
Members of the Parliament of Finland (2019–23)